Diana and Cupid is an oil painting by the Italian artist Pompeo Batoni, painted in 1761, and it is now currently displayed on the Metropolitan Museum of Art in New York.

Description
Sir Humphrey Morice, a businessman and the then Governor of the Bank of England, purchased the work from Batoni on April 1, 1762. Morice, an animal lover, commissioned Batoni to portray an allegory of himself resting on the Roman countryside in a form of a dog and mythical figures of Greek god and goddess namely Cupid and Diana respectively. The allegory illustrates where Diana snatches the bow of Cupid in order to make him rest for a while. The portraiture of Diana is based from a sleeping statue of Ariadne in the Vatican City. The painting is a counterpart for Anton Raphael Mengs Neoclassical type paintings.

References

1761 paintings
Paintings by Pompeo Batoni
Paintings in the collection of the Metropolitan Museum of Art
Paintings depicting Diana (mythology)
Paintings of Cupid
Dogs in art
Allegorical paintings by Italian artists
18th-century allegorical paintings